The Woodbury Country Club (WCC) was a private golf club in Woodbury, New Jersey. It was incorporated in August 1897 and had been one of the 100 oldest private golf clubs in the country as of August 2009. Among some of the club's original officers was George Gill Green, a patent medicine entrepreneur, who served as the club's vice resident. Due to the economy, the golf club was unable to sustain operations, and the club went into foreclosure in 2010.

Notes
 The golf course is described as being nine holes, but it actually has 13 different greens to shoot to.

References

External links

Official website
GolfLink rating

2010 disestablishments in New Jersey
1897 establishments in New Jersey
Buildings and structures in Gloucester County, New Jersey
Golf clubs and courses in New Jersey
Woodbury, New Jersey